Nore Westin (29 September 1937 – 9 February 2016) was a Swedish biathlete. He competed in the 20 km individual event at the 1968 Winter Olympics.

References

1937 births
2016 deaths
Swedish male biathletes
Olympic biathletes of Sweden
Biathletes at the 1968 Winter Olympics
People from Boden Municipality
20th-century Swedish people